Chaudhry Yaqoob is an ex-Inspector General of the Balochistan Police in Pakistan. He was serving within the Prime Minister's Secretariat.

Chaudhry Yaqoob joined 'Pakistan Tehreek-e-Insaf' and contested for the National Assembly in the elections of 2013.

Yaqoob is also the current chairman of the Pakistan Volleyball Federation.
Chaudhry Yaqoob has stressed the police need a health center in the province to provide better health facilities.

References

Pakistani police officers
Living people
Inspector Generals of Balochistan Police
Year of birth missing (living people)